Hofmo is a Norwegian surname. Notable people with the surname include:

 Gunvor Hofmo (1921–1995), Norwegian writer
 Rolf Hofmo (1898–1966), Norwegian politician and sports official

Norwegian-language surnames